Beyreli is a village in the Şehitkamil District, Gaziantep Province, Turkey. The village had a population of 197 in 2021.

References

Villages in Şehitkamil District